Syed Monjur Hossain is a Bangladesh Nationalist Party politician and the former Member of Parliament of Chapai Nawabganj-2.

Career
Hossain was elected to parliament from Chapai Nawabganj-2 as a Bangladesh Nationalist Party candidate in 1979, 1988, 1991, 1996, and 2001.

References

Living people
People from Chapai Nawabganj district
Bangladesh Nationalist Party politicians
2nd Jatiya Sangsad members
4th Jatiya Sangsad members
5th Jatiya Sangsad members
6th Jatiya Sangsad members
7th Jatiya Sangsad members
8th Jatiya Sangsad members
Year of birth missing (living people)